The 2019–20 Cleveland State Vikings men's basketball team  represented Cleveland State University in the 2019–20 NCAA Division I men's basketball season. The Vikings, led by first-year head coach Dennis Gates, played their home games at the Wolstein Center in Cleveland, Ohio as members of the Horizon League. They finished the season 11–21, 7–11 in Horizon League play to finish in a tie for seventh place. They lost in the first round of the Horizon League tournament to Oakland.

Previous season
The Vikings finished the 2018–19 season 10–21 overall, 5–13 in Horizon League play to finish in ninth place. In turn, they failed to qualify for the Horizon League tournament.

On July 12, 2019, it was announced that head coach Dennis Felton was relieved of his duties. On July 26, Dennis Gates was announced as the new head coach.

Roster

Schedule and results

|-
!colspan=12 style=| Exhibition

|-
!colspan=12 style=| Non-conference regular season

|-
!colspan=9 style=| Horizon League regular season

|-
!colspan=12 style=| Horizon League tournament
|-

|-

Source

References

Cleveland State Vikings men's basketball seasons
Cleveland State Vikings
Cleveland State Vikings men's basketball
Cleveland State Vikings men's basketball